Cerritos High School, also called CHS, is a comprehensive, four-year public high school located in Cerritos, California, serving grades 9-12. It is part of the ABC Unified School District.

As of the 2014-15 school year, the school had an enrollment of 2,176 students and 86.2 classroom teachers (on an FTE basis), for a student–teacher ratio of 25.2:1. There were 354 students (16.3% of enrollment) eligible for free lunch and 209 (9.6% of students) eligible for reduced-cost lunch.

History
Cerritos High School began its history in September 1971 by sharing the campus of nearby Gahr High School. Rapidly increasing student population during the 1970s prompted the construction of its current campus, located across the street from the Civic Center, Cerritos Millennium Library, and Cerritos Sheriffs Station in 1973.

Student profile
Student enrollment by ethnicity

CIF-SS Championships
 Boys Swim: 2000, 2001, 2014, 2015, 2016  2002, 2022
 Boys Golf: 2008 
Boys Tennis: 2008, 2009
Girls Tennis: 2013, 2014
 Girls Swim: 2013, 2014, 2015, 2016
Baseball: 1989
 Softball: 2000, 2001
 Softball DIV II : 1999, 2000

Notable alumni

 Justin H. Min, class of 2007—actor best known for The Umbrella Academy
 Tony Ahn, class of 1996—K-pop singer, former H.O.T member
 Marcelo Balboa, class of 1984—US Men's National Soccer Team
 Rickey Cradle, class of 1991—former Seattle Mariner
 Jeff Hearron, class of 1977—former Toronto Blue Jay
 Toby Henderson—pro BMX rider, inventor of the Henderson Hop, and ABA (BMX) Hall of Fame
 Ben Howland, class of 1975—former UCLA Head Basketball Coach (2003-2013)
 Eddie Lewis, class of 1992—Los Angeles Galaxy player
 Alex Lim, class of 2010—entrepreneur and Chief Executive Officer, Empower Trading, LLC
 Roger Lodge—host of Blind Date
 Todd McMillon, class of 1991—former NFL cornerback, Chicago Bears, and Gap model
 Ed Morrissey—conservative blogger at Hot Air
 Jae Park, class of 2010—Top 6 of K-pop Star 1 (Survival Audition Kpopstar), formerly a musician under JYP Entertainment, in a group called Day6
 DJ Rhettmatic—hip hop DJ and producer/member of the Beat Junkies
 Lela Rochon, class of 1982—actor, most notably in the films Waiting to Exhale and The Chamber
 Jorge Salcedo—pro soccer player, Head UCLA Men's Soccer Coach
 Dave Serrano, class of 1982—Head Baseball Coach Tennessee
 Han Ye-seul—Korean actress
 Eddie Soto—soccer player, assistant coach at UCLA
 Kirsten Vangsness, class of 1990—actress, Criminal Minds
 Tim Walton—baseball, Philadelphia Phillies, Head Coach of University of Florida softball team
 Carlos de la Garza, class of 1992—Grammy Award winning producer and musician

References

External links
 Official web site
 Cerritos High page at Greatschools.net
 

ABC Unified School District
Cerritos, California
High schools in Los Angeles County, California
Educational institutions established in 1971
Public high schools in California
1971 establishments in California